This is a list of gliders/sailplanes of the world, (this reference lists all gliders with references, where available) 
Note: Any aircraft can glide for a short time, but gliders are designed to glide for longer.

Yugoslavian miscellaneous constructors
 AAK Pionir IIa
 AK Zagreb Borongaj
 Albatros Vrabac A
 Cancarevic
 Cavka (glider)
 Cener-Slanovec KB-2 Udarnik Dušan Cener & Marjan Slanovec
 Delfin (glider)
 Delfin M-2
 Delfin M-3
 Detter zmaj
 Djurin Komarac I (ustvari motorizovana Cavka-motorized Cavka glider)
 DRAGOVIĆ Jastreb Vuk-T DRAGOVIĆ, Tomislav 
 FAJ Jastreb (VTC-76) Vuk-T
 Fizir-Mikl
 Glisa Stanisavljevic GS-1
 Hosszú-Tišma 1932 Triplane István HOSSZÚ & Vladimir TIŠM
 Hrisafovic HS-62 Cirus HRISAFOVIC, Nenad
 Hrisafovic HS-64 HRISAFOVIC, Nenad
 Ilindenka 1T
 Ilindenka 2
 Ilić Ilindenka – Milos Ilić
 Ilic Mačka ILIC, Milos
 ILZS
 Jastreb bis
 Jastreb 54
 Klobučar 1911 glider KLOBUČAR, Viktor	
 Kokot Pisece
 Kuhelj Inka I/ Ia/ II
 Libis KB-17 Kondor
 Libis KB-18
 Ilić KBI-14 Mačka – built by Savezni Vazduhoplovni Centar, Vršac
 Musa SO-2 – Obad Stanko
 Obad O.S.-3 Musa Kesedzija
 Prva petoletka Roda
 Soko SL-40 Liska – Sour Vazduhoplovna Industrija Soko, Radna Organizacija Vazduhoplovstvo Mostar
 Sova (motor-glider)
 Trener (glider)
 Varoga-Pockaj
 VG-151
 VTRZ Jastreb H-49 Split
 VUK-T – Prof. Dr. Tomislav Dragović at the Faculty of Mechanical Engineering, Aero Engineering Institute, University of Belgrade
 VZ Jastreb  Novi Sad Roda

Notes

Further reading

External links

Lists of glider aircraft